Earl Klapstein (March 8, 1922 – April 28, 1997) was an American football tackle. He played for the Pittsburgh Steelers in 1946.

References

1922 births
1997 deaths
American football tackles
Pacific Tigers football players
Pittsburgh Steelers players
Players of American football from California
People from Lodi, California